The Captive City may refer to:

 The Captive City (1952 film), a 1952 film noir directed by Robert Wise
 The Captive City (1962 film), a 1962 Italian English-language war film directed by Joseph Anthony
 The Captive City, a novel by John Appleby